Chaparra District is one of thirteen districts of the province Caravelí in Peru.

References

Districts of the Caravelí Province
Districts of the Arequipa Region